The  Montreal East Refinery was an oil refinery located in Montreal East and formerly Shell Canada's largest refinery. In October 2010, refinery operations permanently ceased and the facility was subsequently converted into a storage terminal.

History
The defunct refinery, the second owned by Shell in Canada, opened on 24 March 1933. It began with three units; the distillation unit, a topping unit, and cracking catalytic unit.  In 1947 it was expanded with the building of the alkylation and catalytic cracking refining units, and the refining capacity of was increased. From 1947 to 1960, the isomerisation, catalytic reforming, chemicals plants were built and the refining capacity was further increased. During 2002 to 2008, desulphuration units were built and the refining capacity was upgraded to its highest level .

On January 7, 2010 Shell Canada announced closing the refinery and converting it to a fuel terminal.  On June 4, 2010, following the unsuccessful attempts to find a buyer to take over the plant, Shell Canada announced its plans to move forward to downgrade the refinery into a terminal. The conversion commenced in September 2010, with it permanently ceasing operations as a refinery in October 2010. Approximately 800 jobs were lost.

Description
It had alkylation, hydro-cracking, reforming catalytic, cracking catalytic, thermal catalytic, isomerisation, and desulphiration units. Its processing capacities included:
  of visbreaking
  of fluid catalytic cracking
  of semi-regenerative catalytic reforming
  of hydrocracking for distillate upgrading
  of catalytic hydrotreating for cat reformer feeds
  of hydrotreating for kerosene/jet desulfurization
  of API Group I base oil
  of unfinished wax.  The refinery had 154 oil tanks and more than 450 workers.

After its conversion to a storage terminal, the facility receives gasoline, diesel and aviation fuels for distribution.

See also
 Montreal Refinery
 Montreal East Refinery (Gulf Oil Canada)
 Montreal Oil Refining Center
 Scotford Refinery
 Corunna Refinery
 Nanticoke Refinery

References

External links
 Montreal East Refinery (Shell Canada website)
 Map of the refinery
 Refinery Reform Campaign

1933 establishments in Quebec
Industrial buildings and structures in Montreal
Oil refineries in Canada
Shell plc buildings and structures
Montréal-Est, Quebec